Stay with Me may refer to:

Film and television
Stay with Me (2004 film), an Italian film
Stay with Me (2010 film), a Canadian drama film
Stay with Me (2018 film), a South Korean romantic drama film
Stay with Me (TV series), a 2016 Chinese TV series
Stay with Me (Philippine TV series) (Hindi Ko Kayang Iwan Ka), a 2018 drama series

Literature 
 Stay with Me (novel), a 2017 novel by Ayobami Adebayo
 Stay with Me, a 2014 novel by J. Lynn (pen name of Jennifer Armentrout)

Music

Albums 
 Stay with Me (Billie Holiday album), 1955
 Stay with Me (Regina Belle album), 1989
 Stay with Me, by Kiki Dee, 1978
 Stay with Me, by Norman Brown, 2007

Songs 
 "Stay with Me" (Alexander Klaws song), 2003
 "Stay with Me" (Calvin Harris, Justin Timberlake, Halsey and Pharrell Williams song), 2022
 "Stay with Me" (Chanyeol and Punch song), from the soundtrack of Guardian: The Lonely and Great God, 2016
 "Stay with Me" (DeBarge song), 1983
 "Stay with Me" (Erasure song), 1995
 "Stay with Me" (Exile song), 1978
 "Stay with Me" (Faces song), 1971
 "Stay with Me" (Ironik song), 2008
 "Stay with Me" (James Brown song), 1981
 "Stay with Me" (Koda Kumi song), 2008
 "Stay with Me" (Lorraine Ellison song), 1966, also known as "Stay with Me Baby", covered by several artists
 "Stay with Me" (Sam Smith song), 2014
 "Stay with Me" (You Me at Six song), 2010
 "Stay with Me (Brass Bed)", by Josh Gracin, 2005
 "Do Ya/Stay with Me", by McFly, 2008
 "Mayonaka no Door (Stay with Me)", by Miki Matsubara, 1979
 "One More Day (Stay with Me)", originally "Stay with Me", by Example, 2014
 "Stay with Me", by 112 from Room 112, 1998
 "Stay with Me", by Akcent from True Believers, 2009
 "Stay with Me", by Angelic, 2001
 "Stay with Me", by BeBe & CeCe Winans, 1994
 "Stay with Me", by Blue Mink, 1972
 "Stay with Me", by Blue October from This Is What I Live For, 2020
 "Stay with Me", by Bret Michaels from Ballads, Blues & Stories, 2001
 "Stay with Me", by Danity Kane from Danity Kane, 2006
 "Stay with Me", by Diana Ross from To Love Again, 1981
 "Stay with Me", by the Dictators from Bloodbrothers, 1978
 "Stay with Me", by Dolores O'Riordan from Are You Listening?, 2007
 "Stay with Me", by Eighth Wonder, 1987
 "Stay with Me", by Finch from What It Is to Burn, 2002
 "Stay with Me", by Foghat from Stone Blue, 1978
 "Stay with Me", by the Gap Band from Gap Band IV, 1982
 "Stay with Me", by Gigi D'Agostino, 2010
 "Stay with Me", by Gotthard from Silver, 2017
 "Stay with Me", by Hatchie from Keepsake, 2019
 "Stay with Me", by Howard Jones from Transform, 2019
 "Stay with Me", by In Flames from I, the Mask, 2019
 "Stay with Me", by Kaoru Amane, stage name of Erika Sawajiri, 2006
 "Stay with Me", by Ken Hirai from Stare At, 1996
 "Stay with Me", by the Mission from God's Own Medicine, 1986
 "Stay with Me", by Orchestral Manoeuvres in the Dark from English Electric, 2013
 "Stay with Me", by Perry Como from Lightly Latin, 1966
 "Stay with Me", by Pharrell Williams from In My Mind, 2006
 "Stay with Me", by Ricki-Lee Coulter from Ricki-Lee, 2005
 "Stay with Me", by Ryan Adams from Ryan Adams, 2014
 "Stay with Me", by Spiritualized from Ladies and Gentlemen We Are Floating in Space, 1997
 "Stay with Me", by Sweet from Cut Above the Rest, 1979
 "Stay with Me", by Thrice from To Be Everywhere Is to Be Nowhere, 2016
 "Stay with Me", by Tú, 1987
 "Stay with Me", from the musical City of Angels, 1989
 "Stay with Me", from the musical Into the Woods, 1986
 "Stay with Me (A Little While Longer)", by Ed Townsend, 1960
 "Stay with Me (By the Sea)", by Al Green from Lay It Down, 2008
 "Stay with Me (Unlikely)", by Celldweller from Celldweller, 2003